The TAI Hürkuş (Free Bird) is a tandem two-seat, low-wing, single-engine, turboprop aircraft being developed by Turkish Aerospace Industries (TAI) as a new basic trainer and ground attack aircraft for the Turkish Armed Forces.

The aircraft is named after Vecihi Hürkuş, a World War I and Turkish Independence War veteran pilot, a Turkish aviation pioneer and the first Turkish airplane manufacturer.

Design and development
The TAI Hürkuş Development Program started with an agreement signed between Turkish Undersecretariat for Defense Industries (Savunma Sanayii Müsteşarlığı (SSM)) and TAI in March 2006. Under the agreement the company will design, manufacture and complete the civil certification the aircraft to European Aviation Safety Agency CS 23 standards.

By June 2012 the Hürkuş program had consumed one million man-hours with the work of 140 engineers. About a quarter of the Turkish engineers who have worked on Hürkuş are female, as well as two of the three project heads.

The Hürkuş will be equipped for day and night flying as well as basic pilot training, instrument flying, navigation training, weapons and formation training. The aircraft will have good visibility from both cockpits with a 50 degree down-view angle from the rear cockpit, cabin pressurization (nominal 4.16 psid), Martin-Baker Mk T-16 N 0/0 ejection seats, an onboard oxygen generation system (OBOGS), an Environmental Control System (Vapor Cycle Cooling), an anti-G system, high shock absorbing landing gear for training missions, and Hands On Throttle and Stick (HOTAS). Microtecnica of Turin, Italy has been selected to provide the aircraft's environmental control system. The Hürkuş has been designed for a 35-year service life.

The Hürkuş development program has been subject to delays. In 2007 it was forecast that the first prototype would fly in late-2009 with first delivery, upon completion of the certification process, forecast for 2011. On 27 June 2012, the Hürkuş was officially rolled out at a ceremony held at TAI's Kazan premises. The forecast date for the first flight was then delayed until later in 2012 and actually occurred on 29 August 2013 when the aircraft flew from the Ankara Akıncı Air Base on a 33-minute flight.

The Turkish government has indicated that the aircraft is expected to attract export sales, possibly from Middle Eastern countries, African countries or countries with limited air force budgets. According to a news report from CNN Türk, Australia and Sweden are interested in the aircraft.

In 2016, the Hürkuş-A trainer aircraft was awarded a CS-23 Validation Type Certificate by the European Aviation Safety Agency (EASA) and an Aircraft Type Certificate by the Turkish Directorate General of Civil Aviation (DGCA)

The Turkish Army has an order for 15 Hürkuş-B aircraft plus an option for 40 more. Deliveries are scheduled for mid 2017

In February 2017, photos were released by the Turkish MoD showing the prototype for armed version, the Hürkuş-C.

Variants

Hürkuş-A
Basic version which has been certified with EASA according to CS-23 requirements. It is intended for the civilian market.
In 2016, the Hürkuş-A trainer aircraft was awarded a CS-23 Validation Type Certificate by the European Aviation Safety Agency (EASA) and an Aircraft Type Certificate by the Turkish Directorate General of Civil Aviation (DGCA).
Hürkuş-B
Advanced version with integrated avionics (including HUD, MFDs, and Mission Computer). Cockpit avionics layout is similar to F-16 and F-35 fighters. The Turkish Army has an order for 15 aircraft plus an option for 40 more. Deliveries are scheduled for mid 2017.
Hürkuş-C
An armed version for the close air support role in addition to pilot training missions,  will have a maximum weapons load of 3,300lb (1,500kg) and also carry a forward-looking infrared (FLIR) sensor. It will be capable of operating from unprepared runways. The Turkish Army has expressed interest in using the aircraft in counter-terrorism environments and is expected to attract export orders. The main advantage will be to lower the cost of air power, especially in low-intensity combat theatres where anti-air warfare threats are minimal.
In February 2017, photos were released by the Turkish MoD, showing the Hürkuş-C prototype carrying Roketsan UMTAS anti-tank guided missiles, Roketsan Cirit laser-guided rockets, an electro-optical and infrared (EO/IR) pod (likely the Aselsan Common Aperture Targeting System or CATS), and external fuel tanks.
The Turkish Armed Forces are scheduled to receive deliveries in 2018.

On 7 April 2017, a Hürkuş-C fired a Roketsan L-UMTAS anti-tank missile that successfully hit the target on the ground.

Coast Guard version
TAI plans to offer another version of the Hürkuş to support the Turkish Coast Guard's maritime patrol operations. The aircraft's rear seat would be occupied by an operator for a FLIR sensor using an ASELSAN FLIR system.
Hurkus-C UAS
An unmanned version of the Hurkus-C Counter-Insurgency Aircraft being developed for the Turkish Armed Forces.

Operators 
 
 Turkish Air Force – 3 B variant operational, 15 total B variant ordered. 6 Air-ground integration variant delivered.

 Libyan Air Force - on order

 
 Niger Air Force – on order

Specifications (Hürkuş)

See also

References

External links
 Official website
 TAI Hürkuş roll-out video

Hurkus
2010s Turkish military trainer aircraft
Single-engined tractor aircraft
Low-wing aircraft
Single-engined turboprop aircraft
Aircraft first flown in 2013